The Holcim Group, legally known as Holcim Limited, (formerly known as LafargeHolcim) is a Swiss-French multinational company that manufactures building materials. It has a presence in around 70 countries, and employs around 72,000 employees. Holcim operates four businesses segments: cement, aggregates, ready-mix concrete, and other products, including precast concrete, asphalt, mortar, and other building materials.

Originally, the company was established as LafargeHolcim by the merger on 10 July 2015 of Holcim and Lafarge, which had combined sales of CHF 26.7 billion in 2019. In the 2020 Forbes Global 2000, it was ranked as the 280th largest public company in the world.

History

On 7 April 2014, Lafarge and Holcim announced a merger project to create LafargeHolcim. With a combined market value exceeding $50 billion, the merger was the second largest announced worldwide in 2014. On 10 July 2015, the two companies completed the merger and created LafargeHolcim. On 15 July 2015, the new LafargeHolcim Group was officially launched.

In June 2016, Le Monde reported that Lafarge paid taxes to ISIS middlemen in 2013 to 2014 to keep using their factory in Jalabiya, Northeastern Syria. On 2 March 2017, the Board of Directors of LafargeHolcim issued a statement indicating that the measures required to continue operations at the plant were unacceptable.

A comprehensive and independent investigation revealed significant errors in judgment that were inconsistent with the company's code of conduct and the company took action. There have been significant changes and developments made to the compliance program and infrastructure since the time of the alleged misconduct.

The former CEO, Eric Olsen, resigned in April 2017 because of the "strong tensions" incurred by the news. However, an investigation conducted by Baker McKenzie concluded Olsen was not responsible for the payments.

In an interview with the French newspapers LeFigaro, Beat Hess, chairman of the board said: "Unacceptable errors were made that the Group regrets and condemns. It's far easier to say this in hindsight but the Group certainly pulled out of Syria too late. All of this should have been avoided".

Meanwhile, Sherpa filed a lawsuit against Lafarge over the payments. In March 2017, French Foreign Minister Jean-Marc Ayrault criticized LafargeHolcim for competing to build the wall on the border of Mexico–United States border promised by President Donald Trump. They were also criticised by presidential candidate Emmanuel Macron.

In May 2017, Jan Jenisch was appointed as the new CEO of LafargeHolcim Group. In March 2018, Jan Jenisch announced a new strategy, Strategy 2022 – ‘Building for Growth’, which aims to drive profitable growth and simplify the business to deliver resilient returns and attractive value to stakeholders.

In May 2018, LafargeHolcim announced the next steps in the simplification of corporate organization. The corporate management positions in Switzerland will be moved to the company's Holderbank site and a new corporate office in Zug.

In January 2019, LafargeHolcim completed the sale of its 80.6% stake in PT Holcim Indonesia Tbk, its Indonesian cement business, to Semen Indonesia Group for US$1.41 billion.

During the summer, in July 2019, LafargeHolcim introduced Plants of Tomorrow, a four-year program that will see the utilization of automation technologies and robotics, artificial intelligence, predictive maintenance and digital-twin technologies across their entire cement production process.

In August 2019, the firm announced a "commercial breakthrough for low-carbon cement", Solidia Concrete, which "reduces the overall carbon footprint in precast concrete by 70%".

Later in the year, in Fall 2019, LafargeHolcim announced the allocation of 160 million Swiss francs ($161 million) on 80 projects across Europe to cut annual emissions from its cement manufacturing processes by 15% by 2022.

In September 2020, LafargeHolcim joins the Science Based Targets initiative (SBTi) “Business Ambition for 1.5°C” becoming the first global building materials company to sign the pledge with intermediate targets for 2030, validated by SBTi.

On May 4, 2021, shareholders voted on changing the company name back to Holcim. The new identity of the company was launched on July 8, 2021. This name change applies only to the group company name with all market brands remaining in existence.

In September 2021, Holcim reached an agreement to sell its Brazilian cement business to Companhia Siderúrgica Nacional at an enterprise value of US$1.025 billion.

In May 2022, Adani Group acquired Holcim's stake in Ambuja Cements and ACC for US$10.5 billion. The sale marked Holcim's exit from India after 17 years of operations as part of a strategy to focus on core markets.

Operational
Holcim Group operates in around seventy countries, and focuses on cement, aggregates, ready mix and solutions & products. It is a global partner for major infrastructure projects – roads, mines, ports, dams, data centers, stadiums, wind farms, or electric power plants that require major investments.

The group employs around 70,000 people around the world, and reach a combined net sales of CHF 26.7 billion in 2019. The group's central functions had been divided between Zurich and Paris until the end of 2018, but are currently being transferred to the Swiss cities of Holderbank and Zug. The company's research facilities are in l'Isle d'Abeau, near Lyon, France.

Headquartered in Switzerland and listed on the SIX Swiss Exchange and on Euronext Paris, Holcim Group holds leading positions in all regions across the globe. The building materials market is driven by massive global population growth, the shift towards city and urban living and the infrastructure, the highways, bridges, hospitals and schools, that growing populations require.

Management
Jan Jenisch took over as CEO of the group on 1 September 2017. Beat Hess is the chairman of the board of directors.

Members of the executive committee are formally appointed by the Board of Directors:
 Jan Jenisch, Chief Executive Officer
 Géraldine Picaud, Chief Financial Officer
 Jamie Gentoso, Member (Solution & Products Business Unit)
 Miljan Gutovic, Member (Europe and Middle East Africa)
 Toufic Tabbara, Member (North America)
 Martin Kriegner, Member (Asia)
 Oliver Osswald, Member (Latin America)
 Magali Anderson, Member (Chief Sustainability Officer)
 Mathias Gärtner, Member (Head Legal and Compliance)
 Feliciano González Muñoz, Member (Head of Group Human Resources)

On 15 October 2019, Jan Jenisch was appointed to the board of the World Business Council for Sustainable Development (WBCSD).

See also
Main competitors:
 Cemex
 Italcementi
 Eurocement group
 Votorantim Group
 CRH plc
 Semen Indonesia
 HeidelbergCement
 Siam Cement Group

References

External links

 
Cement companies of Switzerland
Manufacturing companies established in 2015
Multinational companies headquartered in Switzerland
Companies listed on the SIX Swiss Exchange
Companies listed on Euronext Paris
Companies based in Zug
Swiss companies established in 2015